Alfredo Juan Mayordomo (born 23 January 1984 in Aspe, Province of Alicante), commonly known as Máyor, is a Spanish professional footballer who plays for FC Jove Español San Vicente as a forward.

External links

1984 births
Living people
People from Vinalopó Mitjà
Sportspeople from the Province of Alicante
Spanish footballers
Footballers from the Valencian Community
Association football forwards
Segunda División players
Segunda División B players
Tercera División players
Segunda Federación players
Tercera Federación players
Divisiones Regionales de Fútbol players
Hércules CF B players
Hércules CF players
Benidorm CF footballers
UE Lleida players
Villajoyosa CF footballers
Ontinyent CF players
UE Sant Andreu footballers
SD Ponferradina players
UD Las Palmas players
AD Alcorcón footballers
CF Reus Deportiu players
CD Castellón footballers
Burgos CF footballers
CF Badalona players
Xerez Deportivo FC footballers